Daniel "Dan" M. Kaiser (born December 31, 1980 in Saint Paul, Minnesota) is an American politician and a Republican member of the South Dakota House of Representatives representing District 3 since January 11, 2013.

Elections
 2012 Redistricted to District 3, and with incumbent Democratic Representative Dennis Feickert redistricted to District 1, Kaiser ran in the June 5, 2012 Republican Primary; in the four-way November 6, 2012 General election, incumbent Republican Representative David Novstrup took the first seat and Kaiser took the second seat with 5,201 votes (27.78%) ahead of Democratic nominees Bill Antonides and Zachary Anderson.
 2008 To challenge incumbent District 2 Democratic Representatives Paul Dennert and Elaine Elliott, Kaiser ran in the June 3, 2008 Republican Primary but lost the four-way November 4, 2008 General election to incumbent Representatives Dennert and Elliott, who took the first and second seats respectively.

References

External links
 Official page at the South Dakota Legislature
 Campaign site
 Profile at Project Vote Smart
 Biography at Ballotpedia
 Financial information (state office): Dan Kaiser (2012-present) at the National Institute for Money in State Politics
 Financial information (state office): Daniel Kaiser (2008) at the National Institute for Money in State Politics

1980 births
Living people
Republican Party members of the South Dakota House of Representatives
Politicians from Aberdeen, South Dakota
Politicians from Saint Paul, Minnesota
United States Army reservists
21st-century American politicians